West Ouachita High School It is administered by the Ouachita Parish School Board, which ranks second out of sixty-six school systems in Louisiana.  
It is fully accredited by the Southern Association of Colleges and Schools.  The sports team's mascot is the Chief.

History 
When West Ouachita High School opened in the fall of 1989, it was an ultra-modern
facility designed around a courtyard and amphitheater. Architects capitalized on the
thirty-six acre sloping site to construct a multi-leveled building with 
of heated area. The total cost amounted to eight million dollars. The library was
equipped with a computerized service are and some 15,000 volumes. The athletic
facilities are also modern and include a gymnasium, a football stadium, six tennis courts,
an all-weather track, a baseball diamond, and a softball diamond.

Enrollment began with 720 students the first year, and the enrollment continues to
increase to the present enrollment of 1152 students. Because of this increased enrollment,
there was a need for more classrooms. Consequently, the Ouachita Parish School Board
purchased an additional twenty-one acres of land and authorized an 11.5 million dollar
expansion program which began in the summer of 2002 and was completed in the spring
of 2003. This expansion included ten classrooms, an expanded main office area, an
auditorium, a new room and practice area for its award-winning band, and a new athletic field house. In addition, the former athletic facilities were remodeled for the schools award-winning NJROTC and the old band room was remodeled for the expanding choir.

In 2009 the school expanded to include an Agricultural center and green house, and again in 2010, when a new turf football field was laid. Also, in 2011 the school added a new conference room.

In 2015 the school made plans to expand the campus again. This expansion includes a new 2-story state of the art gymnasium, 6 new tennis courts, and 2 new parking lots; all to accommodate the school's growing population. Completion is expected in 2017.

Athletics 
West Ouachita High athletics competes in the LHSAA.

Championships 
In 2005, the Chiefs baseball team won the LHSAA 4A State Championship, defeating Northwood High School 11-3. 

The Chiefs also hold 2 individual track and field State Championships. Of these were Jacob Heckford, winning the 4A Boys 800m run in 2009. In 2014, Andre Johnson, David Lee, Terrell Russell, and Gabriel Tumey took home the 4A Boys 1600m relay with a winning time of 3:21.87.

Notable alumni 
Ken Coon, (Class of 1954), politician
Zach Watson (Class of 2016), outfielder for the LSU Tigers

Notable faculty 
Leonard Griffin, former professional football player, Defensive Line Coach

See also 
 List of high schools in Louisiana

Notes

External links
 

Schools in Ouachita Parish, Louisiana
Public high schools in Louisiana